Cybalomia lactealis is a moth in the family Crambidae. It is found in Algeria.

References

Cybalomiinae
Moths described in 1915